"Taurus Here" is the debut single by Atlanta-based Crunk&B–girl group Taurus. It was written by producer D. Smitty alongside Taurus member Domanica "Doma" Raye, and served as the lead single for Taurus's unreleased self-titled debut album. The song is also noted for its heavy sampling of Salt-n-Pepa's 1987 hit single, "Push It", which served as a tribute to the rap group. 

In the week of July 2, 2005, the song debuted on Billboard's Hot R&B/Hip-Hop Songs chart as a Hot Shot at number 70. In its third week, the song leaped to its peak position of 16, where it was named the third song to garner greatest airplay (behind Tony Yayo's "So Seductive" and Mariah Carey's "We Belong Together"). By November 2005, the song fell off the chart, spending a total of 18 weeks.

Music video

Background
The video was filmed on June 28, 2005, and saw a limited release in August 2005. It was directed by Lisa Cunningham and Adam Bush, choreographed by EGYPT and featured a cameo appearance by Cristal "Serious" Steverson from Vh1's former programming Flavor of Love.

Synopsis
The video begins with the girls entering The Atlanta Institute of Performing Arts, where they decide to audition in front of a judging panel in the style of American Idol. The group then begins to dance with various students from the Institute along with one of the judges. The video then cuts to the girls waiting outside, being informed that their song is being played on the radio; a scene transitions to the whole Institute body dancing to their song outside campus and ends with the group posing for pictures in promotion of a private concert.

Charts

References

2005 debut singles
2005 songs
American hip hop songs
Southern hip hop songs
American contemporary R&B songs
Songs written by Ray Davies
Songs written by Hurby Azor
Crunk songs